Spring Frost is a 1919 painting by the Australian artist Elioth Gruner. The painting depicts a small herd of dairy cows in the early morning. Gruner's most well-known painting, Spring Frost was awarded the Wynne Prize in 1919.

Spring Frost was largely painted en plein air at Emu Plains—now an outer western suburb of Sydney but then a rural area—on the farm built by Isaac Innes and inherited by his son Jim Innes. It is Jim Innes in this painting with his cattle.  Elioth Gruner's 1916 painting Morning Light also shows this farm. To compose the painting Gruner built a small structure on site to protect the canvas and, to avoid frostbite, he wrapped his legs with chaff bags.

References

External links
Spring Frost — Art Gallery of New South Wales collection

1919 paintings
Cattle in art
Collections of the Art Gallery of New South Wales
Wynne Prize
Paintings by Elioth Gruner